Taungdaw Thakhinma (lit. 'mitress of the great mountain')  is a Burmese nat (deity).

Legend
Legend has it that Taungdaw Thakhinma was Ma Shwe U, a daughter of U Shwe Thee, a wealthy man from In Kyal village, and Daw O Zar. She was good at weaving. She married Ko Yin Maung, a timber merchant from Taungbyone village, followed him to Taungbyone. Soon after, Ko Yin Maung went down a wooden raft to the upper Meza area. At the time, Shwe Hpyin Nyidaw, a spirit who crushed her and confessed his love. However, Ma Shwe U did not respond to his love. She was killed by his tiger.

References

Burmese nats
Burmese goddesses
Burmese culture